Sheikh Shahidul Islam is a Bangladeshi politician who was elected to parliament for Madaripur-3 as a Jatiya Party candidate in 1986, and served as Minister for Education, Public Works, Youth and Sports from 1984 to 1990.  He is the current secretary general of the Jatiya Party (Manju).

Career
In 1972 and 1975 he headed the Jatiya Chhatra League, the student front, of the BAKSAL government of Bangladesh. Islam was the Minister of Education from January 1989 to May 1990. Since 2008 he is the secretary general of the Jatiya Party fraction lead by Anwar Hossain Manju.

Personal life
His uncle was the first president of Bangladesh Sheikh Mujibur Rahman. He is married to Yasmin Islam. They have three children together (2 sons and 1 daughter)

References

Awami League politicians
Living people
Sheikh Mujibur Rahman family
3rd Jatiya Sangsad members
4th Jatiya Sangsad members
Year of birth missing (living people)
Bangladesh Krishak Sramik Awami League central committee members